Muli (Dhivehi: މުލި) is the capital of Meemu Atoll, and the proposed capital for the Medhu Province of the Maldives in the Indian Ocean.

History
Muli was one of the ten Maldivian islands worst affected by the 2004 Indian Ocean earthquake and tsunami.

Geography
The land area of the island was described as being  in 2018.

Demography

Healthcare
Muli has a pharmacy.
Has Regional Hospital with specialist like Gynecologist, Peadiatrician, General Surgeon, Aneasthetist and General Medical officers, Dental officer, Physical Therapist. Other facilities like X-ray, Laboratory services also available. Mulee Physical Therapy department is one of best in Maldives, patients are visiting from near by Island and from other Atoll too take a good therapy from here.

Economy

Infrastructure
On 26 March 2021 BML introduces Self-Service Banking in Meemu Muli

References

Islands of the Maldives